Lorenz Spengler (22 September 1720 – 20 December 1807) was a Danish turner and naturalist.

Born in Schaffhausen, Switzerland he arrived at Copenhagen in 1743 and became a tutor to Christian VI of Denmark and later Frederick V of Denmark in the art of turning. From 1771 he was head of the Royal Art Chamber (Det Kongelige Kunstkammer), a position he held until his death in 1807. Among his works is "Beskrivelse og Oplysning over den hindindtil lidet udarbeidede Sloegt af mangeskallede Konchylier som Linnaeus har kaldet Lepas med tilfoiede nye og ubeskrevne Arter ", a treatise on shelled molluscs including many new species descriptions, of which six taxa are still valid. Spengler maintained a personal natural history collection, the Museo Spengleriano.

Spengler is commemorated in the scientific name of a species of Southeast Asian turtle, Geoemyda spengleri. He is also celebrated in the common name of the Spengler's freshwater mussel, Margaritifera auricularia.

References

External links
 Rosenborg Slot
 Spengler's correspondence to Linnaeus

Conchologists
1720 births
1807 deaths
18th-century Danish scientists
Danish naturalists
Swiss naturalists
People from Schaffhausen
Swiss emigrants to Denmark